Sånta Rita-Sumai, formerly Santa Rita and encompassing the former municipality of Sumay, is a village located on the southwest coast of the United States territory of Guam with hills overlooking Apra Harbor.  According to the 2020 census it has a population of 6,470, which is up slightly from 6,084 in 2010 but down from 11,857 in 1990. Santa Rita is the newest village in Guam, having been established after the Second World War.

History

As the rest of the island, Sånta Rita-Sumai was under Spanish rule. Prior to the War, the village of Sumay was on the Orote Peninsula, which forms the southern boundary of Apra Harbor. Once a thriving commercial center, it suffered severe devastation from bombardment by the United States military forces during the Liberation of Guam from the Empire of Japan. The U.S. military assumed control over the ruins of Sumay and built Naval Base Guam on the old village site, while the residents of Sumay were relocated to the hills between their former village and Fena.

They established a new village, naming the settlement after Saint Rita of Cascia. The Fena area, which houses Ordnance Annex and Fena Lake (the main source of fresh water for the island), borders the eastern boundary of Sånta Rita-Sumai.

In August 2021, Gov. Lou Leon Guerrero signed a bill officially changing the name of the village.

Demographics
The U.S. Census Bureau counts it under multiple census-designated places: Santa Rita, and Apra Harbor.

Education

The Department of Education serves the public schools in Sånta Rita-Sumai.

Sånta Rita-Sumai contains Harry S. Truman Elementary School,  Southern High School, and PACE (Program of Alternative Certification for Educators), which was once Santa Rita Elementary School.  H.S. Truman Elementary serves Santa Rita residents, while Southern High School serves Santa Rita, Agat and villages allocated by DoE districting.  PACE serves students in need throughout the DoE program. Oceanview Middle School in Agat serves middle school residents.

In addition, Commander William C. McCool Elementary/Middle School (Originally Guam South Elementary/Middle School), operated by the Department of Defense Education Activity, is located on Naval Base Guam, nearly the old Sumay village site.

Notable residents
Speaker Antonio Unpingco (1942–2007) - Member of the Guam Legislature

Government

Commissioners (Sumay) 
 Joaquin C. Diego (1927–1930)
 Vicente T. Borja (1930–1931)
 Tomas P. Sablan (1931–1935)
 Gregorio S. Borja (1935–1937)
 Vicente D. Lizama (1937–1939)
 Juan P. Sarmiento (1939–1941)

Commissioner (Sånta Rita-Sumai) 
 Juan N. Perez (1945–1952)
 Joaquin D. Perez (1952–1969)
 Pedro L.G. Roberto (1969–1973)

See also 
 Villages of Guam

References and external links 

 Rogers, Robert F (1995). Destiny's Landfall: A History of Guam: University of Hawaii Press.

External links 
 Santa Rita Guam at Guam Portal
 PDN Village Maps
 

 
Census-designated places in Guam